The 2003 Skate Canada International was the second event of six in the 2003–04 ISU Grand Prix of Figure Skating, a senior-level international invitational competition series. It was held at the Hershey Centre in Mississauga, Ontario on October 30 – November 3. Medals were awarded in the disciplines of men's singles, ladies' singles, pair skating, and ice dancing. Skaters earned points toward qualifying for the 2003–04 Grand Prix Final. The compulsory dance was the Ravensburger Waltz.

Results

Men

Ladies

Pairs

Ice dancing

External links

 2003 Skate Canada International

Skate Canada International, 2003
Skate Canada International
2003 in Canadian sports 
2003 in Ontario
Sport in Mississauga